Bombadil may refer to:

 Tom Bombadil, a character in J. R. R. Tolkien's legendarium
 Bombadil Publishing, a youth-to-youth publishing house in Sweden
 Bombadil (band),  a three-piece Americana, folk-pop band
 Bombadil, Bombadil's first EP